Magna Carda is an American hip hop outfit from Austin, Texas. The group is notable for performing with live instrumentation, and has been called "Austin's answer to The Roots" by Mashable.

Career
Magna Carda was formed in 2011 at St. Edward's University by keyboardist/producer Dougie Do and rapper Megz Kelli. As the group has released previous projects, in January 2014, Magna Carda released their first major mixtape, titled Van Geaux. The group rose to prominence in the Austin music scene after performing at the inaugural X Games in Austin and after being featured in a BuzzFeed article, entitled "40 Songs Proving That Austin, Texas is the Capital of Dope Jams", along with NPR's "Heavy Rotation."

Discography
 Creature Creative (2012)
 Shoe String Theory (2013)
 Van Geaux (2014)
 Van Geaux Remix (2014)
 Like It Is (2014)
 CirQlation (2016)
 Somewhere Between EP (2017)
 Coffee Table Talk Vol. 1 (2017)
 LADEE EP (2019)
 Coffee Table Talk Vol.2 (2020)
 To The Good People'' (2021)

References

External links
Official Website

American hip hop musicians
Musical groups established in 2011
Musical groups from Austin, Texas
2011 establishments in Texas